Jared Brinkman (born February 19, 1999) is a professional gridiron football defensive lineman for the Toronto Argonauts of the Canadian Football League (CFL).

College career
Brinkman played college football for the Northern Iowa Panthers from 2017 to 2021. He played in 55 games where he had 209 tackles, 39.5 tackles for loss, 18.5 sacks, six forced fumbles, and three fumble recoveries.

Professional career
On September 29, 2022, it was announced that Brinkman had signed with the Toronto Argonauts. He spent time on the team's practice roster before making his professional debut in the final game of the regular season on October 29, 2022, against the Montreal Alouettes, where he recorded two defensive tackles. He did not play in the team's East Final victory, but he did make his post-season debut in the 109th Grey Cup game where he had two defensive tackles. Brinkman won his first professional championship as the Argonauts defeated the Winnipeg Blue Bombers by a score of 24–23.

Personal life
Brinkman was born to parents Mike and Carla Brinkman and has one brother, Jake.

References

External links
 Toronto Argonauts bio

1999 births
Living people
American football defensive linemen
American players of Canadian football
Canadian football defensive linemen
Northern Iowa Panthers football players
Players of American football from Iowa
Toronto Argonauts players